Plateilema is a genus of flowering plants in the tribe Helenieae within the family Asteraceae.

Species
There is only one known species, Plateilema palmeri, native to Texas (Big Bend National Park in Brewster County), Coahuila, and Nuevo León.

References

Helenieae
Flora of North America
Monotypic Asteraceae genera